Edward Ledlum (born 15 June 1999) is a Liberian footballer who plays as a forward for Liberian Premier League side FC Bea Mountain.

Club career 
Born in Montserrado County, Ledlum started his playing career at Joy Football Club in the Liberian third division. After a season with Joy FC, he moved to join Brewerville-based third division outfit, Brewerville United. His performance for Brewerville earned him a place in Montserrado County football team for the 2016-17 Liberian National County Meet. He played a key role in helping Montserrado County win the 2016-17 Liberia National County Meet He was later named as the Most Valuable Player of the 2016-17 Liberia National County Meet.

After winning the Liberia National County Meet with Montserrado County, he moved to LISCR FC in the Liberia First Division on a three-year deal. Despite coming from the third division, he became a key player in the LISCR team that won the 2016-17 LFA Cup and the Liberia First Division.

In February 2020, Ledlum moved to Energetik-BGU Minsk in the Belarus Premier League on a two-year deal but was left out of the squad registration at the start of the season after appearing in a single pre-season friendly. The following October, he debuted for Liberian Premier League club Bea Mountain, scoring a goal in the 2–1 victory.

Honors

Club 
 LISCR FC
Winner
 Liberia First Division: 2016-17
 Liberian Cup| FA Cup: 2016-17

County Meet
 Montserrado County
Winner
 Liberian National County Meet: 2016-17

Individual 
Winner
 Liberian National County Meet: Most Valuable Player: 2016/2017

References

External links
 https://www.liberianobserver.com/news/sportsfrom-3rd-division-to-double-1st-division-titles-in-2017/
 http://www.bushchicken.com/from-zero-to-hero-monsterrado-becomes-champions
 http://www.bushchicken.com/liscr-fc-wins-fa-cup-winning-second-title-of-the-season
 http://www.bushchicken.com/county-meet-mvp-edward-ledlum-shines-on-liscr-debut

1999 births
Living people
Liberian footballers
People from Montserrado County
Association football defenders
Liberia international footballers
LISCR FC players